The list of ship launches in 2001 includes a chronological list of all ships launched in 2001.


References 

2001
Ship launches